The 2015–16 Purdue Boilermakers men's basketball team represented Purdue University. Their head coach was Matt Painter, in his 11th season with the Boilers. The team played its home games in Mackey Arena in West Lafayette, Indiana and were members of the Big Ten Conference. They finished the season 26–9, 12–6 in Big Ten play to finish in a four-way tie for third place. As the No. 4 seed in the Big Ten tournament, they defeated Illinois and Michigan to advance to the championship game. In a closely fought championship game, they lost to Michigan State 66–62. The Boilermakers received an at-large bid to the NCAA tournament as a No. 5 seed, their second straight trip to the Tournament. In the First Round, they were upset by No. 12-seed Little Rock 85–83 in double overtime.

Previous season
The Boilermakers finished the 2014–15 season 21–13, 12–6 in Big Ten play to finish in a three-way tie for third place. As the No. 4 seed in the Big Ten tournament, they advanced to the semifinals where they lost to No. 1 seed Wisconsin. The Boilers received an at-large bid to the NCAA tournament as a No. 9 seed. They lost in the Second Round to No. 8-seeded Cincinnati.

Departures

Incoming transfers

Roster

Class of 2015 recruits

Caleb Swanigan had multiple high caliber teams recruiting him. Swanigan verbally committed to Michigan State April 10, 2015, but decommitted from the school on May 7. Twelve days later, he committed to Purdue and was the first Indiana's Mr. Basketball recruit since Glenn Robinson. He was also Purdue's first McDonald's All-American since 1996.

Ryan Cline committed to Purdue on June 2, 2014. Cline, an Indiana native, was expected to improve Purdue's 3-point shooting. On his recruitment, Cline said, "From the first visit to (Purdue) when I saw all of their coaches there, it just blew me away," he said. "Getting to know them from that time, I knew they wanted me."

Grant Weatherford was Purdue's last commitment of this class, committing to Purdue on August 2, 2014. On Weatherford's potential impact as a freshman, Coach Painter said, "Well, he’s got to be able to get by some of those guys. Johnny Hill’s got a lot of experience. P.J. Thompson, you know, obviously played some for us last year, and both of those guys have really played well."

Schedule and results

|-
!colspan=9 style=|  Exhibition

|-
!colspan=9 style=|  Non-conference regular season

|-
!colspan=9 style=|Big Ten regular season

|-
!colspan=9 style=| Big Ten tournament

|-
!colspan=9 style=| NCAA tournament

Rankings

*AP does not release post-NCAA tournament rankings

See also
2015–16 Purdue Boilermakers women's basketball team

References

Purdue Boilermakers men's basketball seasons
Purdue
Purdue
2015 in sports in Indiana
2016 in sports in Indiana